Ndlovukati (literally, "She-Elephant", pl. tiNdlovukati; also spelled Indlovukazi) is the Siswati title for the female monarch of Eswatini. The title is given preferentially to the mother of the reigning king (styled the Ngwenyama, "Lion of Swaziland"), or to another female royal of high status if the king's mother has died. The title is roughly equivalent to a queen mother, though she is jointly head of state, ruling alongside the Ngwenyama. The title can also mean doctor. When there is no king, the Ndlovukati rules as queen regent. The current Ndlovukati is Queen Ntfombi Tfwala, the mother of Ngwenyama Mswati III and wife of Sobhuza II. She was also queen regent from 1983 until 1986 when Mswati became king. The most notable queen regent was Ndlovukati Labotsibeni Mdluli who ruled Swaziland from 1899 until 1921 when she abdicated for Sobhuza II.

Origins 
The Ndlovukati is traditionally joint monarch of Eswatini with the king. The king is seen as the administrative head of state, while the Ndlovukati is seen as the spiritual and national head of state. During the reign of Sobhuza II the title became more ceremonial. Several of the Ndlovukati's functions are to control important ritual substances (sometimes called medicines) and knowledge necessary for inaugurating of the rule of a Ngwenyama, rainmaking, and the annual renewal of national and kingly strength in the incwala rites. The Ndlovukati also leads the nation as queen regent following a king's death and during the youth of the crown prince. Other notable Tindlovukati are Tsandzile Ndwandwe, Lojiba Simelane, Tibati Nkambule, and Labotsibeni Mdluli from nineteenth century Swaziland.

History 
Historically, there have been a number of Ndlovukati with great substantial power as well as influence, especially (though not exclusively) in periods of regency. The power of the Ndlovukati was explicitly understood as a counterweight to that of the Ngwenyama and also to potentially rival royal princes. This was the case especially during the reign of Mswati II and Tsandzile Ndwandwe. Like royal governors who were not from the royal Dlamini dynasty, the Ndlovukati could not accede to the throne, thus offering an alternative source of power to rein in overweaning Tingwenyama who could not challenge directly to be the Ngwenyama.

During the long reign of Sobhuza II (1899-1982), his grandmother Ndlovukati Labotsibeni Mdluli (also known as "Gwamile") was the last great bearer of the title, being the primary Swazi political power from Sobhuza's accession as an infant in 1899 until his accession to full power in 1922. However, over the following 60 years the practical power and influence of the office of ndlovukati became greatly overshadowed, in part because the British chose to recognize the powers of the king (whom they called the "Paramount Chief") over those of the senior, in part because of the force of Sobhuza's personality in contrast to the tindlovukati who succeeded his own mother after she died in 1938, and in part because of conservative aristocratic Swazi male reactions to colonialism, which created a new and more rigid form of patriarchy now called and argued by some to be mischaracterised as "traditional". The office of Ndlovukati suffered a further blow after the death of Sobhuza II, when a holder of the office was implicated in the political machinations of Prince Mfanasibili aimed at usurping the kingship. Thus the political-cultural ideals and historical meanings of the office expressed above do not really characterise the Ndlovukati today, whose position has become much weaker than that of the Ngwenyama.

At any time where there is both an Ingwenyama and a Ndlovukati, which is most of the time, there are two royal villages. Even during a regency when the king is a minor, a proto-form of his headquarters is prepared. The King's headquarters is where he carries out his administrative duties; the Ndlovukati'''s, which is called umphakatsi, (meaning "the inside," and a term also applied to the royal insiders and close allies as a group) is the national capital and spiritual and ceremonial home of the nation. The king resides at his own royal village or kraal called lilawu. The present umphakatsi is at Ludzidzini Royal Kraal and lilawu is at Ngabezweni Royal Kraal.

 List of tiNdlovukati 
 LaYaka Ndwandwe, 1745–1780 (Regent 1780)
 Lomvula Mndzebele, 1780–1815 (Regent 1815)
 Lojiba Simelane, 1815–1840 (Regent 1836–1840)
 Tsandzile Ndwandwe (LaZidze), 1840–1875 (Regent 1868–1875)
 Sisile Khumalo (Lamgangeni), 1875
 Tibati Nkambule (Madvolomafisha), 1875–1894 (Regent 1889–1894)
 Labotsibeni Mdluli (Gwamile, Lamvelase), 1894–1925 (Regent 1899–1921)
 Lomawa Ndwandwe, 1925–1938
 Nukwase Ndwandwe, 1938–1957
 Zihlathi Ndwandwe/Mkhatjwa, 1957–1975
 Seneleleni Ndwandwe, 1975–1980
 Dzeliwe Shongwe, 1982–1983 (Regent 1982–1983)
 Ntfombi Tfwala, 1983–present (Regent 1983–1986'')

Queen Mother Standard

References 

African queen mothers
Swazi monarchy
Swazi physicians